Arewa is a small pre-colonial animist dominated state of the Dallol Maouri valley of Niger, known for the indigenous Maouri/Mawri Hausa culture.

Contemporary rule
Arewa's traditional leadership continues a largely ceremonial reign in the 21st century, centered just north of the town of Dogondoutchi. Arewa, still home to a shrinking animist Hausa community, hosts a yearly religious festival which draws both believers and foreign tourists.

Other usage
Arewa is simply a Hausa language term meaning "northern" or "northerners".  Derived from the Hausa word for "North", "Areoun", the "-wa" the typical "People of" suffix, Arewa has several alternate meanings specific to the geography and politics of modern Nigeria, south of Niger.

See also 
 Arewa: for the more general usages of the term in Nigeria.

References

Geography of Niger
History of Niger